Sergey Lapochkin may refer to:

 Sergey Lapochkin (referee, born 1958), retired Russian football referee
 Sergey Lapochkin (referee, born 1981), Russian football referee